The following is a list of events relating to television in Ireland from 1984.

Events

2 January – Jim Mitchell is appointed Minister for Communications with responsibility for broadcasting.
February – Charlie Bird becomes the first reporter on RTÉ Television to present a news item via satellite, when he reports from the Philippines on the imprisonment, trial and subsequent release of Fr. Niall O'Brien.
1–4 June – RTÉ presents live coverage of U.S. President Ronald Reagan's visit to Ireland. RTÉ sends twice-daily newsfeeds to Eurovision for world distribution during the visit. The coverage includes an interview with Reagan recorded in Washington for the programme Today Tonight and a special edition of Newstime which is broadcast on U.S. television.

Debuts

RTÉ 1
25 June –  The Edison Twins (1984–1986)
29 June –  The Doombolt Chase (1978)
16 July –  Heathcliff and Marmaduke (1981)
2 November – Davis at Large (1984–1986)
24 December –  The Snowman (1982)
Undated – MT-USA (1984–1987)
Undated -  Masquerade (1983-1984)

RTÉ 2
26 July –  The Biskitts (1983–1984)
7 November – Leave It To Mrs O'Brien (1984–1986)

Ongoing television programmes

1960s
RTÉ News: Nine O'Clock (1961–present)
RTÉ News: Six One (1962–present)
The Late Late Show (1962–present)

1970s
Sports Stadium (1973–1997)
Trom agus Éadrom (1975–1985)
The Late Late Toy Show (1975–present)
RTÉ News on Two (1978–2014)
Bosco (1979–1996)
The Sunday Game (1979–present)

1980s
Today Tonight (1982–1992)
Mailbag (1982–1996)
The Irish R.M. (1983–1985)
Glenroe (1983–2001)

See also
1984 in Ireland

References

 
1980s in Irish television